The Fall released many recordings following their inception in 1976, often inviting use of the tag 'prolific'. The band’s debut on vinyl came in June 1978 when "Stepping Out" and "Last Orders" were released by Virgin Records on Short Circuit: Live at the Electric Circus, a compilation of live recordings made at the Manchester venue The Electric Circus in October 1977 just before it was closed. Their first actual release as a group was the EP Bingo-Master's Break Out! (1978), and they released a studio album at a rate of almost one a year from their debut Live at the Witch Trials in 1979 to their final album New Facts Emerge in 2017.

Albums

Studio albums

Part studio, part live albums

Live albums

Compilation albums

Box sets

Video albums

EPs

Singles

See also
Mark E. Smith discography

Notes

References

External links
Discography at the Fall online formerly: The Official Fall Website (1998 – Feb 2006); The Unofficial Fall Website (February 2006 – October 2007)

 
Discographies of British artists
Fall, The